Shivaree was a Los Angeles-based music variety show that ran in syndication from 1965 to 1966. It was created and hosted by KFWB-AM personality Gene Weed, LA's top nighttime DJ at the time, and who in later years became a producer for Dick Clark Productions.

In its brief run, the show featured numerous well-known acts, including The Mamas & the Papas, The Supremes, The Rolling Stones, Jackie Wilson, Marvin Gaye, Ronnie Dove, James Brown,  Stevie Wonder, The Ronettes, Cher, Simon and Garfunkel, The Byrds, The Toys, The Bobby Fuller Four, Allan Sherman, Lesley Gore, and Gary Lewis & the Playboys, and was taped at KABC-TV's studios in LA. It began in syndication in April 1965 and ran through May 1966 in more than 150 markets in the U.S. and seven countries internationally. Although it was a syndicated series, Shivaree was produced and owned by the ABC network.

In addition to the host, the show also featured dancers (go-go girls), including Teri Garr, Cathy Austin, Joane Sannes, and Kay Parks, who danced on elevated platforms behind the bandstand while guest artists performed. Audience members surrounded the bandstand and also stood on a balcony behind the dancers.

Rights to surviving footage of the show (which was produced in black-and-white) are now owned by Research Video.

References

External links
https://www.imdb.com/name/nm0917235/
 
 

1960s American variety television series
1960s American music television series
1965 American television series debuts
1966 American television series endings
Black-and-white American television shows
Dance television shows
First-run syndicated television programs in the United States
Pop music television series